Noureddine Ould Ménira (born 6 May 1968), is a Mauritanian Olympic sprinter.

Ménira competed in two Summer Olympics. At the 1992 Summer Olympics he competed in the 100 metres, finishing 7th in his heat in a time of 11.22 seconds and failing to advance to the next round. Four years later at the 1996 Summer Olympics in the 100 metres he ran a time of 10.95 seconds but only finished in 9th place, so again he didn't advance.

References

1968 births
Living people
Mauritanian male sprinters
Olympic athletes of Mauritania
Athletes (track and field) at the 1992 Summer Olympics
Athletes (track and field) at the 1996 Summer Olympics